The enzyme L-arabinonate dehydratase catalyzes the chemical reaction

L-arabinonate  2-dehydro-3-deoxy-L-arabinonate + H2O

This enzyme belongs to the family of lyases, specifically the hydro-lyases, which cleave carbon-oxygen bonds.  The systematic name of this enzyme class is L-arabinonate hydro-lyase (2-dehydro-3-deoxy-L-arabinonate-forming). Other names in common use include L-arabonate dehydrase, L-arabonate dehydratase, and L-arabinonate hydro-lyase.  This enzyme participates in ascorbate and aldarate metabolism.

References 

 

EC 4.2.1
Enzymes of unknown structure